National Yunlin University of Science and Technology (YunTech or simply NYUST) is a university of science and technology in Taiwan. Founded in 1991 and located in Yunlin County. It was restructured as a technological university in 1997. It's a member of "National Yunlin University system" with National Taiwan University, and accredited by AACSB, ACCSB and IEET.

Yuntech is organized into several colleges, including the College of Engineering, College of Management, College of Design, College of Humanities and Applied Sciences, and College of Future.

Yuntech is currently the 3rd-ranked university of science and technology in Taiwan, on the rankings of Times Higher Education World University Rankings and U.S. News & World Report.

History
In the beginning, Wenji Hsu(許文治), the then governor of Yunlin County, believed that there was only one College in Yunlin County, which was disparate compared to other counties and cities, so the development of high-level education standards in Yunlin was a top priority. Initially, he did not succeed in his bid to get National Chung Cheng University established in Yunlin, so he continued to fight for the establishment of a university of the high level, with the goal of "contributing to the development of education in Yunlin". At the beginning of the school's construction, the County Government provided the Ministry of Education as the site for the school's construction. In addition, Yunlin Junior High School had to be relocated due to the establishment of the Yunlin Institute of Technology.

National Yunlin Institute of Technology (1989–1997)
The Executive Yuan approved the establishment of the Preparatory Office and the Ministry of Education approved the establishment of the National Yunlin Institute of Technology in 1989. Dr. Wen-Hsiung Chang (張文雄), then president of National Taipei University of Technology, was appointed as the director of the preparatory office. 
National Yunlin Institute of Technology  was officially established on July 1, 1991, with 352 new students, and the first president was Dr.Wen-Hsiung Chang, the director of preparatory work. On August 1 of the year, the first phase of construction was completed, and eight departments were initially established: mechanical engineering, electrical engineering, electronic engineering, industrial management, business management, information management, industrial design, and business design.
In accordance with the Ministry of Education to encourage the conversion of meritorious schools into technical colleges, National Yunlin Institute of Technology was renamed National Yunlin University of Science and Technology(Yuntech).  Along with National Taiwan University of Science and Technology and Chaoyang University of Technology were the first batch of technical colleges in Taiwan to be successfully converted into technical universities.

National Yunlin University of Science and Technology (1997–Present)
In 2001, President Wen-Hsiung Chang retired and was succeeded by Dr. cōng-míng Lin(林聰明) as the second president, with the goal of "building a humanistic learning environment, and making every effort to promote industrialization, e-corporation, and internationalization."
In 2005, Cheers Magazine's Best Universities Guide ranked National Yunlin University of Science and Technology 9th in the country for the amount of money spent per person on student talent and research ethos. 。
In 2009, Dr. Yǒngbīn Yáng(楊永斌), a tenured professor at National Taiwan University , took over the presidency of Yunlin University of Science and Technology, with the goal of developing "a strong academic culture and first-class creativity.
On December 6, 2018, signed a memorandum of cooperation with National Taiwan University, and National Formosa University to establish the National Yunlin University Consortium.

Campus Life

YunTech is located in Douliu, Yunlin County, Central Taiwan, with access via highways and railway system, 226 km south of Taipei, capital city of Taiwan. The university occupies about 60 hectares. 8 artistic works are placed around the campus, and the Art Center of YunTech periodically holds exhibitions.

The library totals 16,529 square meters and has 1,750,000 volumes in its collection which include journals in Chinese and other languages, e-database and e-learning resources. It also includes online databases in all subject areas for technological universities nationwide.

YunTech hosted the National Intercollegiate Athletic Games in 2006 and 2014.

List of Presidents

Colleges and schools

College

Rankings and reputation

National Yunlin University of Science and Technology is ranked 601-800 in the world by the Times Higher Education 2023, 1931th in the world by CWUR, and 1730th by U.S. News & World Report.

Campus
National Yunlin University of Science and Technology (Yuntech) is located in Douliu City, Yunlin County. The campus area covers 56.1 hectares and is adjacent to the Taiwan Route 78 Gukeng Interchange, National Freeway 1, and National Freeway 3. The representative Yunmeng Lake is located in the south near the student dormitory, and the lotus pond near the creative workshop is filled with lotus flowers during the lotus viewing season from May to October every year. Some of the campus facilities of National Yunlin University of Science and Technology have been listed as Cultural Assets of Yunlin, such as the Yunxu Building, which was originally the school building of Yunlin Junior High School, the first national high school building built in Yunlin County.

Yuntai Performance Hall
Yuntai Performance Hall is a fan-shaped building that will be completed in 2021. The YunTech Auditorium was formerly an auditorium built in 1994, and initially functioned as a lecture hall. The name Yun(雲)stands for "Cloud", which means "clouds", and also symbolizes National Yunlin University of Science and Technology. And "Tai"(泰), which means "peace and prosperity" and "greatness" in chinese.

Arts Center and Library
The Art Center is adjacent to the main library on campus.

Yunxu Building
Located next to the College of Engineering, Yunxu Building was originally the first building of Yunlin Junior High School when it was founded in the 57th year of the R.O.C.

College of Design department Three
Located along the central axis, the greenery on the north side of the base and the planting on the north side of the Design Center form a continuation of the green belt.

Longtan Road
Long Tan Road runs through the campus of Yunlin University of Science and Technology and is a must-use road for Yunlin students to commute to work and live conveniently nearby. In the early days, the red brick pavement was in disrepair and often involved in car accidents until September 2016 when the road was repaved and refurbished with tarmac.

External links
 List of universities in Taiwan
 List of Universities of Science and Technology in Taiwan

National Yunlin University of Science and Technology Official Site (English)
Office of International Affairs, Yuntech
360 view of Yuntech

References

1991 establishments in Taiwan
Educational institutions established in 1991
Universities and colleges in Yunlin County
Scientific organizations based in Taiwan
Universities and colleges in Taiwan
Technical universities and colleges in Taiwan